Hemiancistrus votouro is a species of catfish in the family Loricariidae. It is native to South America, where it was collected from a stream in the Uruguay River basin in Brazil. The stream that the species is known from is reported to be 2 to 5 m (6.6 to 16.4 ft) in width, with a substrate composed of rock and sand, moderate marginal vegetation, and rapids separated by pools. The species reaches 14.1 cm (5.6 inches) SL. Its specific epithet reportedly honors the Votouro Indian Reserve in Benjamin Constant do Sul, Rio Grande do Sul, Brazil.

References 

Ancistrini
Fish described in 2004